The Second Man is 1959 Egyptian action film written and directed by Ezz El-Dine Zulficar. The film features an ensemble cast that includes Samia Gamal, Sabah, Salah Zulfikar and Rushdy Abaza.

Plot 
Ismat Kazem is the second man in an international gang between Cairo and Beirut, and no one knows who the first man is, who lives most of his time in a cabaret and around him is his mistress, the dancer Samra, who does not want to recognize his daughter from Samra and attributes her to a bar worker. He falls in love with Lamia, but she ignores his feelings and decides to marry a rich man. The first man issues an order to kill Ibrahim, Lamia's brother, because he went out of his way, so Lamia reports to the police and asks to know who the killers of her brother are. Here comes the police officer Kamal who impersonates her second brother, Akram, who lives in Brazil, and Lamia returns to the cabaret to work, causing others to Samra. Kamal manages to enter the gang's den as the most honorable brother of Lamia, and while he is there, he begins to feel love for Lamia, and apparently she loves him back. Out of hatred towards Ismat, Samra helps Kamal in his chase to arrest Ismat, but Ismat turns to the first man to smuggle him, but the first man surprises Ismat by eliminating him, as he is the only one he knows and thus represents the greatest danger to him. Then Kamal arrives and manages to arrest the first man red-handed with the killing of Ismat. And Kamal finally wins the love of Lamia.

Staff 

 Directed by: Ezz El-Dine Zulficar
 Story and script: Youssef Gohar, Ezz El-Dine Zulficar
 Dialogue: Youssef Gohar
 Cinematography: Waheed Farid
 Editing: Albert Naguib
 Soundtrack: Andre Ryder
 Produced by: Salah Zulfikar
 Executive Producer: Ezz El-Dine Zulficar
 Distribution: Al Sharq Films Distribution

Cast 
 Samia Gamal: (Samra / Sakina El-Feki)
 Sabah: (Lamia Sukkar)
 Salah Zulfikar: (Officer Kamal / Akram)
 Rushdy Abaza: (Ismat Kazem)
 Salah Nazmi: (Hussam)
 Mahmoud Farag: (Asfour)
 Badr Nofal: (Darwish al-Attar / Dewars)
 Abdul-Ghani Al-Nagdi: (the mayor)
 Qadariyya Qadari: (Qadariyyah)
 Gamil Ezz El-Din: (Akram Sukkar)
 Waza: (the little girl, Mona Darwish)
 Nasr El-Din Mustafa: (Director of Investigations)
 Abdul-Azim Kamel: (Doctor)
 Mohammed Sobeih: (Police man)
 Abdul-Khaleq Salih: (Sherif / First Man)
 Hussein Ismail: (Al-Shawish Muhammad)
 Hassan Hamed: (Camelo)
 Hussein Qandil: (customs officer)
 Abdul Moneim Ismail: (The man of the suit)
 Rashad Hamed: (Mahgoub)
 Nageeb Abdo: (customs officer)
 Sayed Al Arabi: (One of the gangsters)
 Abdel Moneim Bassiouni: (Owner of the autograph)
 Ahmed Ghanem: (The Magician Rabadar Gamahara)
 Toson Moatamed: (Vest in port)
 Mukhtar al-Sayyid: (The autograph man)
 Sherif Hamdi: (Among the gang men)

Songs 
All songs performed by Sabah

 'Thirsty

Written by Fatehi Qora, composed by Mounir Mourad

 Oh, from his eyes.

Written by Fatehi Qora, composed by Mounir Murad

 Tell me aye

Written by Mamoun El-Shennawy, composed by Mohamed El-Mougui

References

External links 
 
 The Second Man on elCinema

1959 films
1950s Arabic-language films
Egyptian action films
1950s action films
Egyptian black-and-white films
Films directed by Ezz El-Dine Zulficar